The 3rd constituency of Indre-et-Loire is a French legislative constituency in Indre-et-Loire.

Historic representation

Election results

2022

 
 
 
 
 
|-
| colspan="8" bgcolor="#E9E9E9"|
|-

2021 by-election

2017

2012

References

External links 
Results of legislative elections since 1958

3